Eilema discifera is a moth of the subfamily Arctiinae. It was described by George Hampson in 1900. It is found in South Africa.

References

Endemic moths of South Africa
discifera
Moths described in 1900